Uzunköprü is a town in Edirne Province in Turkey.  It is named after a historical stone bridge, claimed to be the world's longest, on the Ergene River. It is a strategically important border town, located on the routes connecting Turkey to the Balkans and Europe.  Uzunköprü is the largest and the second most populous town of Edirne Province.

The town is served by Uzunköprü railway station.

Etymology 
The Greek  and Turkish names  of the town can both be translated as long bridge.

History 
The history of Uzunköprü goes back to the Neolithic Era (8000–5500). In the field surveys conducted in Maslıdere, situated along the route going to Kırkkavak village to the south, many ware fragments overlaid with ornamental striped and pressed figures have been discovered with designs that have never been encountered in Greece and Bulgaria. Nevertheless, the information about this era is inadequate because the researches haven't been taken further. In addition, the history of the region from these ages to the 15th century BC is still unknown, so the previous claims do not stand.
 
In 15th century BC the land began to be settled by the Thracians and they had become tho sole owner of the place for a long time. However, after the 7th century BC the Thracian domination came to end by the continuous invasions over the years and got into the hands sequentially of Greeks, Persians, Romans and Byzantines.
 
Although the region has a very old past, a city had never been able to be built on the area where today's Uzunkopru exists because it'd been covered with vast swamps and dense forests till the Ottomans. That's why, the closest city to today's settlement built in the region is Plotinopolis, established by the Roman Emperor Trajan (AD 53–117) on the banks of the Maritsa River between Uzunkopru and Didymoteicho in Greek Thrace, that was named after Trajan's wife Pompeia Plotina and became a bishopric, suffragan of Adrianople. This ancient city is also called Old Uzunkopru. Eventually, the region was captured from the Byzantine Empire after the Ottoman conquest of Adrianople (which became renamed Edirne) in the 1360s, and only afterwards it could be possible for Uzunkopru city to be established.

Uzunköprü is the first Turkish city established in Rumelia by the Ottoman Empire. It was founded by Great Sultan Murad II in 1427 under the name of Ergene City. The establishment of the city is the result of both the necessity of a settlement place acting as a junction point on the ways connecting the Ottoman capital Edirne to Gallipoli and the Balkans and secondly taking16 years to build the Long Bridge over the Ergene River. Murat II decided to build a stone bridge over the Ergene River when his army couldn't pass the river during a campaign against Gallipoli because of the flood caused by the heavy rain at that time and collapse of the temporary wooden bridges easily. The first 360- arched stone bridge built between 1424 and 1427 wasn't found satisfactory, thereby destructed and rebuilt by Murad II. It is that second bridge existing in the city today. The construction of this second bridge had lasted from 1427 to 1443 and could be finished in 16 years. Due to the long-lasting works, the meeting of the needs of the workers and the soldiers protecting them and the area became indispensably necessary and had to be built a mosque, public kitchen, caravanserai, madrasah, hammam and two water mills as facilities besides. Subsequently, families from firstly Edirne and later the Turkmen tribes who had passed onto Rumelia was brought and settled in the region to maintain and develop those facilities, thus it was laid the foundations of the city. This very first settlement called as Cisr-i Ergene (Ergene Bridge) had immediately become the trade route of the merchants carrying goods from Edirne to Gallipoli overland for shipping to Europe, Egypt and Syria, and flourished rapidly. In the beginning of 20th century the small town have mixed population of Turks, Bulgarians, Greeks, Orthodox Albanians, Armenians, Jews, Gypsies etc. In 1913 Turks uprooted 300 Bulgarian families, and till 1922 evicted all Greeks, Orthodox Albanians, Armenians etc.

Uzunköprü remained under Turkish sovereignty uninterruptedly till the 19th century. However, in the following years it had been occupied four times up to the dissolution of the Ottoman Empire: by Russia twice, from 20 August to 20 November 1829 and 21 January 1878 to 13 March 1879; by Bulgaria, from 2 November 1912 to 19 July 1913 and lastly by Greece, from 25 July 1920 to 18 November 1922. In the last occupation the Greeks renamed Uzunköprü Makrifere.  The city regained its present name after reconquered by the Turks on 18 November 1922. Eventually, Uzunköprü was left in Turkey in the Lausanne Treaty signed after the Turkish Independence War with the Allied Powers with which the Maritsa River became the border between Turkey and Greece. Today, the date of 18 November is celebrated as Uzunköprü's Independence Day to commemorate the liberation from the Greek occupation.

Geography 

Uzunköprü city is located at the westernmost border of Turkey and in the middle of Edirne province. It is bordered by Greece and Meric town to the west, Tekirdag to the east, Kırklareli to the northeast, Ipsala and Kesan to the South, Edirne city and Havsa to the North. It has an area of 1224 km2 (472 sq mi). Because it was established on Ergene Plain, almost 75% of the city's territory is made up of low-lying areas that has an elevation of 18 m. Small hills and plateaus scattered especially to the north and the south from place to place form the sole heights encountered in the region. The highest point of the city is Suleymaniye Hill with a 221 m (725 ft) height.

Uzunköprü's weather is under the influence of severe Thracian Transitional Type of the Mediterranean climate which is a mixture of continental and maritime climates. The winds generally blow from the north with medium speed. While summers are hot and near-rainless,  winters pass cold and precipitation often takes the form of snow. Most of the rain falls in the spring. Although the city has a semi-humid climate, its flora is steppe. As 70% of the unbuilt area is composed of arable soils that's allocated to cultivation, 20% of the rest is meadows and pastures, and 10% is forests and shrubland. The amount of the forestland has started to increase in the last years in result of the afforestation works.

The Long Bridge, Uzunköprü 

Uzunköprü is the longest historical stone bridge of the world, and gives its name to Uzunköprü town. It was built by head architect Muslihiddin between 1427–1443 to span the Ergene river with the order of Sultan Murad II and brought into use with a ceremony attended by the Sultan himself in 1444. It's been located on a militarily and commercially highly strategic point connecting the capital Edirne to Galipoli and the Western Rumelia.

The bridge was built of binding ashlar blocks brought from the quarries in Yagmurca, Eskikoy and Hasırcıarnavut  villages, to each other with Horasan cement. The construction process was supervised firstly by Ghazi Mahmud Bey and after his death by Ishak Bey. Although today its length is 1238.55 m (4063 ft)  from the first arch to the last, its original length used to be 1392 m (4566 ft) with extended wings that don't exist today. The reason of why it was built this long was that the region used to be covered with vast swamps in that period. In addition, because the Ergene River causes flood in rainy season, the arches over the river were built high and opened seven bleed ports in them to prevent the bridge from collapse. The wings and arches of the bridge which has 13.56 m (44.48 ft) height, are embellished with several lion, elephant, bird, eagle, tulip and geometric relief motifs.

Because it has been through a lot of flood and earthquake disasters since the construction, the bridge underwent many restorations during the tenures of  Sultan Mehmet the Conqueror, Osman II, Mahmud II and Abdulhamid II to repair the damages. In the final restoration made between 1964 and 1971 in the Republic period, its width was increased from 5.24 m (17.19 ft) to 6.80 m (22.3 ft) by widening from the both sides and lost its originality. In addition, the initial arch number of 174 reduced to 172 after one of them collapsed in time and two of them were united as one. However, with a new restoration and rehabilitation work thought to be performed, the bridge was planned to return to its original form and get pedestrianized.

Other sights

The Monument of Liberty (Liberty Fountain) 
It is the democracy monument erected in memory of the reenactment of the Ottoman Constitution that's one of the milestones of the history of the Turkish democracy. With the re-declaration of the Constitution ( Kanun-i Esasi) on 23 July 1908, the Ottoman Empire's regime was changed from absolute monarchy to parliamentary regime and started an unprecedented era of freedom in the whole Empire. Uzunkopru didn't stay idle to these new political changes and the Liberty Monument was erected at the right side of the bridge's entry in such a political atmosphere to celebrate this great event with the contributions of the District Governor and Ottoman intellectual Mazhar Müfit Kansu and the Mayor Hafiz Ismail Yayalar on 11 December 1908.

Measuring  in height, the monument was placed on a  pedestal. Although in its initial form, there were two fountains as one on the front for people and the other on the left for animals, these fountains were removed and covered up in 1938. The four themes of the French Revolution; liberty, equality, fraternity and justice were written on the markers and put atop of the first liberty monument of the Turkish history on the four sides.  However, the original markers were lost while the monument was being moved to  left of its primary place during the bridge restoration in 1964 and haven't been able to be found so far. The markers existing on the monument today are the replicas of their genuines. The Monument of Liberty was saved from oblivion with a complete restoration and opened to public just 104 years after it was built on 11 December 2012.

The Mosque of Murad II (Muradiye Mosque) 

The Mosque of Murad II which is located in the Muradiye neighbourhood, was built by Ottoman Sultan Murad II (reigned 1421–1444 and 1446– 1451) along with the Uzunkopru and opened to service in 1444. It's one of the mosques carrying the title of Selatin, a mosque commissioned by the Ottoman dynasty. Although the Muradiye Mosque was originally built as a part of Külliye, areligious building complex, with a hammam (bayh) and an imaret (public kitchen) around, today only the mosque has survived.

Although initially the roof used to be structured as a dome, later this dome was removed during the renovation works in Osman II period (1618–1622) and replaced with a span roof coated with lead. It is the biggest span roofed mosque built up by the Ottomans. It has a capacity of 500 people. On the other hand, with a  height, it is pretty low for a mosque. That is why, its windows are almost aligned with the fringes of the roof.

Although in its original state 12 wooden pillars were used to support the porch, in the restorations performed in the ensuing years, those pillars have been removed and a wall built instead. Apart from this, the mosque hosts a small cemetery in the backside, where the prominent people of the city were interred.

The minaret adjacent to the wall of the mosque is made of ashlar and introduced into the body with Turkish triangles on a rectangular pedestal. The minaret body is round and has a single balcony.

The courtyard of the mosque has three gates situated as two in the west and one in the east. On the main entrance gate located in the west, there is a marble inscription plaque written by the famous Ottoman historian Abdurrahman Hibri recording that the mosque was built by Murad II in 1443 and renovated by Osman II in 1621.

In the courtyard, there is a shadirvan (fountain) covered with a pyramidal spire just across the main entrance. It has an octagonal prism basin and eight taps. The fountain's former eight wooden poles were replaced in a renovation work in 1993 with reinforced concrete columns. The tradition of serving sharbat to the congregation after religious practices in the Ottoman Empire was started for the first time by pouring sharbat from this fountain's taps.

The Church of St. John the Baptist 

The Greek Orthodox Saint John the Baptist Church was built by the Greek community on behalf of Saint John the Baptist (Ioannis Prodromos) in 1875. It is located in the Muradiye neighborhood in Uzunkopru. The church is built of rubble with red bricks scattered among. It was structured as in basilica style with three naves and semi-dome. The apse and the roof are covered with tile. Also the apse and the naves contains barrel vaulted rectangular windows.  The walls of the middle nave are embellished with the frescos depicting twelve apostles separately as six on the right and six on the left.

It is known that over 17,000 Greek citizens had been baptized in the St. John the Baptist Church from 1875 until they left the city in 1924 as a result of the Population Exchange Protocol between Turkey and Greece signed in the Treaty of Lausanne. While the Greek citizens were leaving the city, they took all the items belonging to the church including the great bell, which is being used in the Church of Xanthi now. From 1924 to 2011, the church has been left idle without any use.

The St. John  Church has gained back its old grandeur with the restoration work lasting from 2011 to 2013 by the Uzunköprü Municipality, and opened its doors again after a long time with a big ceremony attended by Patriarch Bartholomew I of Constantinople on 16 December 2013. Today, the church serves as the Art and Culture Center of Uzunköprü.

Gazi Turhan Bey Mosque and Tomb 
A mosque and tomb were built on behalf of Gazi Turhan Bey, who was one of the most famous commanders of Sultan Murat II and Mehmet II (Mehmet the Conqueror) era. He was the son-in-law of Sultan Murat II and brother-in-law of Sultan Mehmet II. His father Pasha Yiğit Bey and his son Ömer Bey were prominent commanders of their time, too. Although his birth and death dates are uncertain, it's generally accepted that he died in mid-1456 and was buried into the tomb built for him in Kırkkavak village.

The village of Kırkavak, which is 8 km away from Uzunkopru, was bestowed as a foundation on him in exchange for his distinguished services in 1454. He built up a Külliye in this village. Evliya Çelebi mentioned about this village in his famous Seyahatname (Book of Travels) as a village with a beautiful mosque, inn (han) and Turkish bath (hammam) in 1658. Today, only the mosque and tomb of this Külliye still exist.

The mosque and the tomb carry the same characteristic structural features with the other contemporary counterparts in Edirne. They both were built on square-plan and made of rubble and brick. In addition the mosque and the tomb which are pretty humble in terms of inner decoration, have single domes covered with lead atop. The mosque was built with one minaret with a balcony and a wooden porch inside as a conclusion of the tradition and the necessity. They both were restored and opened to visit in 2008.

City Museum 

Uzunköprü City Museum was opened to service on 16 December 2013 with conversion of the ex-Tekel (Turkish State Liquor and Tobacco Company) building to a museum following its restoration. The museum building, which is a historical structure on its own, was constructed as a private mansion in the beginning of the 20th century, and from 1939 it had started to be used as Tekel storage, outlet and lodge. After the abolition of the Tekel in Uzunköprü in the 1990s, the building was left disused and had almost come to the brink of collapse. It was recovered by making a museum out of it and transformed into a center sheltering the relics the city possesses.

The double-storied museum has six rooms, and each room was turned into chambers, where the artifacts are displayed by classification according to their species. While the historical items are being displayed generally in the three rooms downstairs, the rooms modified as Bride's and Living Rooms and the Coffee Corner upstairs take the visitors to the scenes, where the past is revived.

The Museum is open to visit for free every weekday except Mondays and holidays.

The Telli Fountain

The Telli Fountain is a four-sided four-taps stone drinking fountain located in the Telli Square in the center of the city. Taking the ornaments and the design of the fountain in consideration, it is believed that it was built in the Tulip period in beginning of the 18th century. The motifs carved on the stone fountain are curved branches and cypress. There are also relief motifs of Istanbul tulip, which is extinct today. The inscription and the decorations on the fountain were erased during the Greek occupation of Uzunköprü. Only their traces are visible today. The fountain was moved to its current place in 1960.

References

External links 

 Uzunköprü website

Cities in Turkey
Greece–Turkey border crossings
Districts of Edirne Province
Populated places in Edirne Province